Céleste is a 1980 German film by Percy Adlon about the life of the French writer Marcel Proust as he lay in his bed from 1912 to 1922; the story is told through the eyes of his real life maid, Céleste Albaret. She waited decades before writing her own book about the experience which was adapted for the screen by Percy Adlon.

Andrew Sarris called the film "one of the most profound tributes one art form has ever paid to another."

Cast
 Eva Mattes as Céleste Albaret
 Jürgen Arndt as Monsieur Proust
 Norbert Wartha as Odilon Albaret
 Wolf Euba as Robert Proust

References

External links 
 
 Céleste at filmportal.de
 Céleste  at percyadlon.com

1980 films
1980s biographical films
German biographical films
West German films
Films directed by Percy Adlon
Works about Marcel Proust
Films set in the 1910s
Films set in the 1920s
Films set in Paris
Biographical films about writers
Cultural depictions of Marcel Proust
Films based on biographies
1980s German films